Wim Peeters (22 August 1925 – 15 August 2011) was a South African sports shooter. He competed in the trap event at the 1960 Summer Olympics.

References

1925 births
2011 deaths
South African male sport shooters
Olympic shooters of South Africa
Shooters at the 1960 Summer Olympics
Sportspeople from Johannesburg
20th-century South African people